The laryngeal theory is a theory in the historical linguistics of the Indo-European languages positing that:
 The Proto-Indo-European language (PIE) had a series of phonemes beyond those reconstructable by the comparative method. That is, the theory maintains that there were sounds in Proto-Indo-European that no longer exist in any of the daughter languages, and thus, cannot be reconstructed merely by comparing sounds among those daughter languages.
 These phonemes, according to the most accepted variant of the theory, were laryngeal consonants of an indeterminate place of articulation towards the back of the mouth.

The theory aims to:
 Produce greater regularity in the reconstruction of PIE phonology than from the reconstruction that is produced by the comparative method. 
 Extend the general occurrence of the Indo-European ablaut to syllables with reconstructed vowel phonemes other than *e or *o.

In its earlier form (see below), the theory proposed two sounds in PIE. Combined with a reconstructed *e or *o, the sounds produce vowel phonemes that would not otherwise be predicted by the rules of ablaut. The theory received considerable support after the deciphering of Hittite, which revealed it to be an Indo-European language.

Many Hittite words were shown to be derived from PIE, with a phoneme represented as ḫ corresponding to one of the hypothetical PIE sounds. Subsequent scholarly work has established a set of rules by which an ever-increasing number of reflexes in daughter languages may be derived from PIE roots. The number of explanations thus achieved and the simplicity of the postulated system have both led to widespread acceptance of the theory.

In its most widely accepted version, the theory posits three laryngeal phonemes in PIE: h₁, h₂, and h₃ (see below). Daughter languages other than Hittite did not preserve the laryngeals themselves, but inherited sounds derived from the merger of these laryngeals with PIE short vowels and the subsequent loss of those laryngeals.

The phonemes are now recognized as consonants, related to articulation in the general area of the larynx, where a consonantal gesture may affect vowel quality. They are regularly known as laryngeal, but the actual place of articulation for each consonant remains a matter of debate. (see below).

The laryngeals got their name because they were believed by Hermann Möller and Albert Cuny to have had a pharyngeal, epiglottal, or glottal place of articulation, involving a constriction near the larynx. While this is still possible, many linguists now think of laryngeals, or some of them, as having been velar or uvular.

The evidence for their existence is mostly indirect, as will be shown below, but the theory serves as an elegant explanation for several properties of the PIE vowel system that made no sense until the theory, such as the independent schwas (as in  'father'). Also, the hypothesis that PIE schwa *ə was a consonant, not a vowel, provides an elegant explanation for some apparent exceptions to Brugmann's law in Indo-Aryan languages.

History

The beginnings of the theory were proposed by Ferdinand de Saussure in 1879, in an article chiefly demonstrating that *a and *o were separate phonemes in PIE.

In the course of his analysis, Saussure proposed that what had then been reconstructed as long vowels *ā and *ō, alternating with *ǝ, was an ordinary type of PIE ablaut. That is, it was an alternation between e grade and zero grade like in "regular" ablaut (further explanations below), but followed by a previously unidentified element. This element accounted for both the changed vowel colour and the lengthening (short *e becoming long *ā or *ō).

So, rather than reconstructing *ā, *ō and *ǝ as others had done before, Saussure proposed *eA alternating with *A and *eO with *O, where A and O represented the unidentified elements. Saussure called them simply , which was the term for what are now in English more usually called resonants; that is, the six elements present in PIE which can be either consonants (non-syllabic) or vowels (syllabic) depending on the sounds they are adjacent to: *y w r l m n.

These views were accepted by a few scholars, in particular Hermann Möller, who added important elements to the theory. Saussure's observations, however, did not achieve any general currency, as they were still too abstract and had little direct evidence to back them up.

This changed when Hittite was discovered and deciphered in the early 20th century. This consonant did not appear to be related to any of the consonants then reconstructed for PIE, and various unsatisfactory proposals were made to explain this consonant in terms of the PIE consonant system as it had then been reconstructed.

It remained for Jerzy Kuryłowicz to propose that these sounds lined up with Saussure's conjectures. He suggested that the unknown consonant of Hittite was, in fact, a direct reflex of the  that Saussure had proposed.

Their appearance explained some other matters as well: For example, why verb roots containing only a consonant and a vowel always have long vowels. For example, in *dō- "give", the new consonants allowed linguists to decompose this further into *deh₃-. This not only accounted for the patterns of alternation more economically than before (by requiring fewer types of ablaut) but also brought the structure of these roots into line with the basic PIE pattern which required roots to begin and end with a consonant.

The lateness of the discovery of these sounds by Indo-Europeanists is largely because Hittite and the other Anatolian languages are the only Indo-European languages for which at least some are attested directly and consistently as consonantal sounds. Otherwise, their presence is to be inferred mostly through the effects they have on neighboring sounds, and on patterns of alternation that they participate in. When a laryngeal is attested directly, it is usually as a special type of vowel and not as a consonant, best exemplified in Greek where syllabic laryngeals (when they appeared next to only consonants) developed as such: *h₁ > e, *h₂ > a, and *h₃ > o.

Varieties of laryngeals
There are many variations of the laryngeal theory. Some scholars, such as Oswald Szemerényi, reconstruct just one laryngeal. Some follow Jaan Puhvel's reconstruction of eight or more.

Basic laryngeal set
Most scholars work with a basic three:

, the neutral laryngeal
, the a-colouring laryngeal
, the o-colouring laryngeal

Additional laryngeals

E.g. PIE  'testicle' yields Albanian  'testicle' but Hittite  'testicle' whereas PIE  '"bear' yields Albanian  'bear' but Hittite  (=/hartka-/) 'cultic official, bear-person'.

 doublet
Another such theory, but much less generally accepted, is Winfred P. Lehmann's view, based on inconsistent reflexes in Hittite, that  was two separate sounds. (He assumed that one was a glottal stop and the other a glottal fricative.)

Direct evidence for laryngeals
Some direct evidence for laryngeal consonants comes from Anatolian:
PIE *a is a fairly rare sound, and in an uncommonly large number of good etymologies, it is word-initial. Thus PIE (traditional) *anti 'in front of and facing' > Greek  'against'; Latin  'in front of, before'; Sanskrit  'near; in the presence of'. But in Hittite there is a noun  'front, face', with various derivatives ( 'first', and so on), pointing to a PIE root-noun  'face' (of which  would be the locative singular). (It does not necessarily follow that all reconstructed forms with initial *a should automatically be rewritten .)

But Luwian has , indicating instead a reconstruction .

Pronunciation
Considerable debate still surrounds the pronunciation of the laryngeals and various arguments have been given to pinpoint their exact place of articulation. Firstly the effect these sounds have had on adjacent phonemes is well documented. The evidence from Hittite and Uralic is sufficient to conclude that these sounds were guttural, pronounced rather back in the vocal tract. The same evidence is also consistent with the assumption that they were fricative sounds (as opposed to approximants or stops), an assumption that is strongly supported by the behaviour of laryngeals in consonant clusters.

*h₁
Jens Elmegård Rasmussen (1983) suggested a consonantal realization for *h₁ as the voiceless glottal fricative  with a syllabic allophone  (mid central unrounded vowel).

Winfred P. Lehmann (1993) theorized, based on inconsistent reflexes in Hittite, that there were two *h₁ sounds: a glottal stop  and an h sound  as in English hat. Beekes (1995) suggested that *h₁ is always a glottal stop .

Later, Kloekhorst (2006) claimed that also Hittite preserves PIE *h₁ as a glottal stop , visible in words like Hittite e-eš-zi 'he is' < PIE *h₁és-ti, where an extra initial vowel sign (plene spelling) is used. This hypothesis has been met with serious criticism; e.g., from Rieken (2010), Melchert (2010), and Weeden (2011).

Simon (2010) supported Kloekhorst's thesis by suggesting that plene spelling in Cuneiform Luwian can be explained in a similar way. Additionally, Simon's (2013) article revises the Hieroglyphic Luwian evidence and concludes that although some details of Kloekhorst's arguments could not be maintained, his theory can be confirmed.

An occasionally advanced idea that the laryngeals were dorsal fricatives corresponding directly to the three traditionally reconstructed series of dorsal stops (palatal, velar, and labiovelar) suggests a further possibility, a palatal fricative .

*h₂
Pharyngeal consonants (like the Arabic letter ح (ħ) as in Muħammad) often cause a-colouring in the Semitic languages.

Uvular fricatives may also colour vowels, thus  is also a noteworthy candidate. Weiss (2016) suggests that this was the case in Proto-Indo-European proper, and that a shift from uvular into pharyngeal  may have been a common innovation of the non-Anatolian languages (before the consonant's eventual loss). Rasmussen (1983) suggested a consonantal realization for *h₂ as a voiceless velar fricative , with a syllabic allophone , i.e. a near-open central vowel.

Kloekhorst (2018) proposes, based on evidence from Anatolian languages, that *h₂ was originally a geminate uvular stop [qː] (he also holds the view that the traditionally voiceless stops of PIE were in fact geminate, as in Hittite), although he judges it plausible that already in PIE it had a fricative allophone.

*h₃
Likewise it is generally assumed that *h₃ was rounded (labialized) due to its o-colouring effects. It is often taken to have been voiced based on the perfect form *pi-bh₃- from the root *peh₃ "drink". Rasmussen chose a consonantal realization for *h₃ as a voiced labialized velar fricative , with a syllabic allophone , i.e. a close-mid central rounded vowel. Kümmel instead suggests .

Kloekhorst (2018) reconstructs [qʷː] as the basic value, which in his view would be the labialized counterpart to *h₂ (see above).

Support for theory from daughter languages
The hypothetical existence of laryngeals in PIE finds support in the body of daughter language cognates which can be most efficiently explained through simple rules of development.

Direct reflexes of laryngeals
Unambiguous examples are confined to Anatolian languages. Words with Hittite ḫ (hh), Luwian h and Lycian x are explained as reflexes of PIE roots with h₂.

In Germanic

Reconstructed instances of *kw in Proto-Germanic have been explained as reflexes of PIE *h₃w (and possibly *h₂w), a process known as Cowgill's law. The proposal has been challenged but is defended by Don Ringe.

In Albanian
In the Albanian language, a minority view proposes that some instances of word-initial h continue a laryngeal consonant.

In Western Iranian

Proposed indirect reflexes
In all other daughter languages, a comparison of the cognates can support only hypothetical intermediary sounds derived from PIE combinations of vowels and laryngeals. Some indirect reflexes are required to support the examples above where the existence of laryngeals is uncontested.

The proposals in this table account only for attested forms in daughter languages. Extensive scholarship has produced a large body of cognates which may be identified as reflexes of a small set of hypothetical intermediary sounds, including those in the table above. Individual sets of cognates are explicable by other hypotheses but the sheer bulk of data and the elegance of the laryngeal explanation have led to widespread acceptance in principle.

Vowel coloration and lengthening
In the proposed Anatolian-language reflexes above, only some of the vowel sounds reflect PIE *e. In the daughter languages in general, many vowel sounds are not obvious reflexes. The theory explains this as the result of H coloration and H loss.

1 H coloration. PIE *e is coloured (i.e. its sound value is changed) before or after h₂ and h₃, but not when next to h₁.

2 H loss. Any of the three laryngeals (symbolized here as H) is lost before a short vowel. Laryngeals are also lost before another consonant (symbolized here as C), with consequent lengthening of the preceding vowel.

The results of H coloration and H loss are recognized in daughter-language reflexes such as those in the table below:

Greek triple reflex vs schwa
Between three phonological contexts, Greek reflexes display a regular vowel pattern that is absent from the supposed cognates in other daughter languages.

Before the development of laryngeal theory, scholars compared Greek, Latin and Sanskrit (then considered earliest daughter languages) and concluded the existence in these contexts of a schwa (ə) vowel in PIE, the schwa indogermanicum. The contexts are: 1. between consonants (short vowel); 2. word initial before a consonant (short vowel); 3. combined with a liquid or nasal consonant [r, l, m, n] (long vowel).

1 Between consonants
Latin displays a and Sanskrit i, whereas Greek displays e, a, or o.

2 Word initial before a consonant
Greek alone displays e, a, or o.

3 Combined with a liquid or nasal
Latin displays a liquid/nasal consonant followed by ā; Sanskrit displays either īr/ūr or the vowel ā alone; Greek displays a liquid/nasal consonant followed by ē, ā (in dialects such as Doric), or ō.

Laryngeal theory provides a more elegant general description than reconstructed schwa by assuming that the Greek vowels are derived through vowel colouring and H loss from PIE h₁, h₂, and h₃, constituting a triple reflex.

1 Between consonants
An explanation is provided for the existence of three vowel reflexes in Greek corresponding to single reflexes in Latin and in Sanskrit.

2 Word initial
The assumption of *HC- in PIE yields an explanation for a dichotomy exhibited below between cognates in the Anatolian, Greek, and Armenian languages reflexes with initial a and cognates in the remaining daughters which lack that syllable, The theory assumes initial *h₂e in the PIE root, which has been lost in most of the daughter languages.

*h₂ster- 'star': Hittite hasterza, Greek astḗr, Armenian astí, Latin stella, Sanskrit tár-

*h₂wes 'live, spend time': Hittite huis- 'live', Greek á(w)esa 'I spent a night', Sanskrit vásati 'spend the night', English was

*h₂ner- 'man': Greek anḗr, Armenian ayr (from *anir), Oscan niir, Sanskrit nár

3 Combined with a liquid or nasal
These presumed sonorant reflexes are completely distinct from those deemed to have developed from single phonemes. 
{| class="wikitable"
|-
! !! *r̥ !! *l̥ !! *m̥ !! *n̥
|-
| Greek || ra, ar || la, al || a || a
|-
| Latin || or || ul || em || en
|-
| Sanskrit || r̥ || r̥ || a || a
|-
|}
The phonology of the sonorant examples in the previous table can only be explained by the presence of adjacent phonemes in PIE. Assuming the phonemes to be a following h₁, h₂, or h₃ allows the same rules of vowel coloration and H-loss to apply to both PIE *e and PIE sonorants.

Support from Greek ablaut
The hypothetical values for sounds with laryngeals after H coloration and H loss (such as seen above in the triple reflex) draw much of their support for the regularization they allow in ablaut patterns, specifically the uncontested patterns found in Greek.

Ablaut in the root
In the following table, each row shows undisputed Greek cognates sharing the three ablaut grades of a root. The four sonorants and the two semivowels are represented as individual letters, other consonants as C and the vowel or its absence as (V).

The reconstructed PIE e grade and zero grade of the above roots may be arranged as follows:

An extension of the table to PIE roots ending in presumed laryngeals allows many Greek cognates to follow a regular ablaut pattern.

Ablaut in the suffix
The first row of the following table shows how uncontested cognates relate to reconstructed PIE stems with e-grade or zero-grade roots, followed by e grade or zero grade of the suffix –w-. The remaining rows show how the ablaut pattern of other cognates is preserved if the stems are presumed to include the suffixes h₁, h₂, and h₃.

Intervocalic H loss 

In the preceding sections, forms in the daughter languages were explained as reflexes of laryngeals in PIE stems. Since these stems are judged to have contained only one vowel, the explanations involved H loss either when a vowel preceded or when a vowel followed. However, the possibility of H loss between two vowels is present when a stem combines with an inflexional suffix.

It has been proposed that PIE H loss resulted in hiatus, which in turn was contracted to a vowel sound distinct from other long vowels by being disyllabic or of extra length.

Early Indo-Iranian disyllables
A number of long vowels in Avestan were pronounced as two syllables, and some examples also exist in early Sanskrit, particularly in the Rigveda. These can be explained as reflexes of contraction following a hiatus caused by the loss of intervocalic H in PIE.

Proto-Germanic trimoraic o

The reconstructed phonology of Proto-Germanic (PG), the ancestor of the Germanic languages, includes a long *ō phoneme, which is in turn the reflex of PIE ā. As outlined above Laryngeal theory has identified instances of PIE ā as reflexes of earlier *h₂e, *eh₂ or *aH before a consonant.

However, a distinct long PG *ō phoneme has been recognized with a different set of reflexes in daughter languages. The vowel length has been calculated by observing the effect of the shortening of final vowels in Gothic.

Reflexes of trimoraic or overlong *ô are found in the final syllable of nouns or verbs, and are thus associated with inflectional endings. Thus four PG sounds are proposed, shown here with Gothic and Old English reflexes:

A different contrast is observed in endings with final *z:

Laryngeal theory preserves regularities in declensions and conjugations by explaining the trimoraic sound as a reflex of H loss between vowels followed by contraction. Thus
 by H loss *oHo > *oo > *ô;
 by H coloration and H loss *eh₂e > *ae > *â > *ô.

(Trimoraic *ô is also reconstructed as word final in contexts that are not explained by laryngeal theory.)

Balto-Slavic long vowel accent
The reconstructed phonology of the Balto-Slavic languages posits two distinct long vowels in almost exact correspondence to bimoraic and trimoraic vowels in Proto-Germanic. The Balto-Slavic vowels are distinguished not by length but by intonation; long vowels with circumflex accent correspond to Proto-Germanic trimoraic vowels. A significant proportion of long vowels with an acute accent (also described as with acute register) correspond to Proto-Germanic bimoric vowels. These correspondences have led to the suggestion that the split between them occurred in the last common ancestor of the two daughters.

It has been suggested that acute intonation was associated with glottalization, a suggestion supported by glottalized reflexes in Latvian. This could lend support to a theory that laryngeal consonants developed into glottal stops before their disappearance in Balto-Slavic and Proto-Germanic.

H loss adjacent to other sounds

After stop consonants
A significant number of instances of voiceless aspirates in the Indo-Iranian languages may be explained as reflexes of PIE stop consonants immediately followed by laryngeals (*CH > *Cʰ).

After resonants
PIE resonants (sonorants) *r̥,*l̥,*m̥,*n̥ are predicted to become consonantal allophones *r, *l, *m, *n when immediately followed by a vowel. Using R to symbolize any resonant (sonorant) and V for any vowel, *R̥V>*RV. Instances in the daughter languages of a vocalic resonant immediately followed by a vowel (RV) can sometimes be explained as reflexes of PIE *R̥HV with a laryngeal between the resonant and the vowel giving rise to a vocalic allophone. This original vocalic quality was preserved following H loss.

Next to semivowels
(see Holtzmann's law)

Laryngeal theory has been used to explain the occurrence of a reconstructed sound change known as Holtzmann's law or sharpening (German Verschärfung ) in North Germanic and East Germanic languages. The existing theory explains that PIE semivowels *y and *w were doubled to Proto-Germanic *-yy- and *-ww-, and that these in turn became -ddj- and -ggw- respectively in Gothic and -ggj- and -ggw- in early North Germanic languages. However, the existing theory had difficulty in predicting which instances of PIE semivowels led to sharpening and which instances failed to do so. The new explanation proposes that words exhibiting sharpening are derived from PIE words with laryngeals.

Many of these techniques rely on the laryngeal being preceded by a vowel, and so they are not readily applicable for word-initial laryngeals except in Greek and Armenian. However, occasionally languages have compounds in which a medial vowel is unexpectedly lengthened or otherwise shows the effect of the following laryngeal. This shows that the second word originally began with a laryngeal and that this laryngeal still existed at the time the compound was formed.

Support for theory from external borrowings
Further evidence of the laryngeals has been found in Uralic languages, and some marginal cases also in Kartvelian. While the protolanguages of these families have not been convincingly demonstrated to be genetically related to PIE, some word correspondences have been identified as likely borrowings from very early Indo-European dialects to early Uralic and Kartvelian dialects. In a few such instances, laryngeal consonants reconstructed in PIE stems show correspondences with overt dorsal or laryngeal consonants in the Proto-Uralic and Proto-Kartvelian forms, in effect suggesting that these forms result from very old PIE borrowings where the consonantal nature of the PIE laryngeals was preserved.

Laryngeals reflected in the Kartvelian languages
The evidence for the preservation of laryngeals by borrowings into Proto-Kartvelian is meagre, but intriguing.

It has been suggested that some examples of an initial Proto-Kartvelian sequence *γw- may reflect sequences of the form *hxw- borrowed from PIE—cp. e.g. PK *γweb- 'to weave' alongside PIE *h₁webʰ- 'id.', PK *γwel- 'to turn, to twist' alongside PIE *(h₁)wel- 'to turn, to roll'—although evidence for *hxw- sequences in most of the proposed PIE source terms is controversial and other possible explanations for Proto-Kartvelian *γw- sequences exist.

A separate suggestion proposes that the PIE *a-colouring laryngeal *h₂ is reflected as Proto-Kartvelian *x in two fruit names borrowed from PIE *(s)méh₂lo- 'apple', namely Proto-Kartvelian *msxal- 'pear' and *sxmart'l̥- 'medlar', the latter etymologically the 'rotten (*t'l̥-) pear'.

Laryngeals reflected in the Uralic languages
Evidence for the PIE laryngeals has been suggested in ancient loans into Proto-Uralic. Work particularly associated with research of the scholar Jorma Koivulehto has identified several additions to the list of Finnic loanwords from an Indo-European source or sources whose particular interest is the apparent correlation of PIE laryngeals with three postalveolar phonemes (or their later reflexes) in the Finnic forms. If so, this would point to great antiquity for the borrowings, since no attested Indo-European language neighbouring Uralic has consonants as reflexes of laryngeals. And it would bolster the idea that laryngeals were phonetically distinctly consonantal.

However, Koivulehto's theories are not universally accepted and have been sharply criticized (e.g. by Finno-Ugricist Eugene Helimski) because many of the reconstructions involve a great deal of far-fetched hypotheses and the chronology is not in good agreement with the history of Bronze Age and Iron Age migrations in the Eastern Europe established by archaeologists and historians.

Three Uralic phonemes have been posited to reflect PIE laryngeals. In post-vocalic positions both the postalveolar fricatives that ever existed in Uralic are represented: firstly a possibly velar one, theoretically reconstructed much as the PIE laryngeals (conventionally marked *x), in the very oldest borrowings and secondly a grooved one (*š as in shoe becoming modern Finnic h) in some younger ones. The velar plosive k is the third reflex and the only one found word-initially. In intervocalic position, the reflex k is probably younger than either of the two former ones. The fact that Finno-Ugric may have plosive reflexes for PIE laryngeals is to be expected under well documented Finnic phonological behaviour and does not mean much for tracing the phonetic value of PIE laryngeals (cf. Finnish kansa 'people' < PGmc *xansā 'company, troupe, party, crowd' (cf. German Hanse), Finnish kärsiä 'suffer, endure' < PGmc *xarđia- 'endure' (cf. E. hard), Finnish pyrkiä < PGmc. *wurk(i)ja- 'work, work for' etc.).

Thus
 PIE laryngeals correspond to the PU laryngeal *x in wordstems like:
Finnish na-inen 'woman' / naa-ras 'female' < PU *näxi-/*naxi- < PIE *[] = */-/ > Sanskrit gnā́ 'goddess', OIr. mná (gen. of ben), ~ Greek gunē 'woman' (cognate to Engl. queen)
Finnish sou-ta- ~ Samic *sukë- 'to row' < PU *suxi- < PIE *sewh-
Finnish tuo- 'bring' ~ Samic *tuokë- ~ Tundra Nenets tāś 'give' < PU *toxi- < PIE *[] = *// > Greek didōmi, Lat. dō-, Old Lith. dúomi 'give', Hittite dā 'take'
Note the consonantal reflex /k/ in Samic.
 PIE laryngeals correspond to Finnic *h, whose normal origin is a Pre-Finnic fricative *š in wordstems like:
Finnish rohto 'medical plant, green herb' < PreFi *rošto < PreG *groH-tu- > Gmc. *grōþu 'green growth' > Swedish grodd 'germ (shoot)'
Old Finnish inhi-(m-inen) 'human being' < PreFi *inši- 'descendant' < PIE *(i)e/o- > Sanskrit jā́- 'born, offspring, descendant', Gmc. *kunja- 'generation, lineage, kin'
 PIE laryngeals correspond to Pre-Finnic *k in wordstems like:
Finnish kesä 'summer' < PFS *kesä < PIE * > Balto-Slavic *eseni- 'autumn', Gothic asans 'summer'
Finnish kaski 'burnt-over clearing' < Proto-Finnic *kaski < PIE/PreG *[] = *// > Gmc. *askōn 'ashes'
Finnish koke- 'to perceive, sense' < PreFi *koki- < PIE *[] = *// > Greek opsomai 'look, observe' (cognate to Lat. oculus 'eye')
Finnish kulke- 'to go, walk, wander' ~ Hungarian halad- 'to go, walk, proceed' < PFU *kulki- < PIE *kʷelH-e/o- > Greek pelomai '(originally) to be moving', Sanskrit cárati 'goes, walks, wanders (about)', cognate Lat. colere 'to till, cultivate, inhabit'
Finnish teke- 'do, make' ~ Hungarian tëv-, të-, tesz- 'to do, make, put, place' < PFU *teki- < PIE  > Greek títhēmi, Sanskrit dádhāti 'put, place', but 'do, make' in the western IE languages, e.g. the Germanic forms do, German tun, etc., and Latin faciō (though OE dón and into Early Modern English do still sometimes means "put", and doen or tun still does in Dutch and colloquial German).

This list is not exhaustive, especially when one also considers several etymologies with laryngeal reflexes in Finno-Ugric languages other than Finnish. For most cases no other plausible etymology exists. While some single etymologies may be challenged, the case for this oldest stratum itself seems conclusive from the Uralic point of view, and corresponds well with all that is known about the dating of the other most ancient borrowings and contacts with Indo-European populations. Yet acceptance for this evidence is far from unanimous among Indo-European linguists, some even regard the hypothesis as controversial (see above).

PIE laryngeals and Proto-Semitic
Several linguists have posited a relationship between PIE and Semitic, almost right after the discovery of Hittite. Among these were Hermann Möller, though a few had argued that such a relationship existed before the 20th century, like Richard Lepsius in 1836. The postulated correspondences between the IE laryngeals and that of Semitic assist in demonstrating their evident existence. Given here are a few lexical comparisons between the two respective proto-languages based on Blažek (2012), who discusses these correspondences in the context of a proposed relation between IE and Afroasiatic, the language family to which the Semitic languages belong:

 Semitic ʼ-b-y 'to want, desire' ~ PIE *[] 'to fuck'
 Semitic ʼ-m-m/y ~ PIE *[] 'to take'
 Semitic ʼin-a 'in', 'on', 'by' ~ PIE *[] > Sanskrit ni, ~ Greek enōpḗ 
 Semitic ʼanāku ~ PIE *h₁eǵ(hom)- 'I'
 Semitic ʻ-d-w 'to pass (over), move, run' ~ PIE *[] 'to pass through'
 Semitic ʻ-l-y 'to rise, grow, go up, be high' ~ PIE *[] 'to grow, nourish'
 Semitic ʻ-k-w: Arabic ʻakā 'to rise, be big' ~ PIE *[] 'to grow, nourish'
 Semitic ʻl 'next, in addition' ~ PIE *[] 'in'
 Semitic: Arabic ʻanan 'side', ʻan 'from, for; upon; in' ~ PIE *[] 'on'

Explanation of ablaut and other vowel changes

A feature of Proto-Indo-European morpheme structure was a system of vowel alternations termed ablaut ("alternate sound") by early German scholars and still generally known by that term (except in French, where the term apophonie is preferred). Several different such patterns have been discerned, but the commonest one, by a wide margin, is e/o/∅ alternation found in a majority of roots, in many verb and noun stems, and even in some affixes (the genitive singular ending, for example, is attested as *-es, *-os, and *-s). The different states are called ablaut grades; e grade and o grade are together "full grades", and the total absence of any vowel is "zero grade".

Examples

Root *sed
Thus the root *sed- "to sit (down)" (roots are traditionally cited in the e grade, if they have one) has three different shapes: *sed-, *sod-, and *sd-. This patterning is found throughout the PIE root inventory and is transparent:

*sed-: (Vedic), **sed-: in Latin sedeō "am sitting," Old English sittan "to sit" < *set-ja- (with umlaut) < *sed-; Greek hédrā "seat, chair" < *sed- (Greek systemically turns word-initial prevocalic s to h, i.e. rough breathing).
*sod-: in Latin solium "throne" (in Latin l sporadically replaces d between vowels, said by Roman grammarians to be a Sabine trait) = Old Irish suideⁿ /suðʲe/ "a sitting" (all details regular from PIE *sod-yo-m); Gothic satjan = Old English settan "to set" (causative) < *sat-ja- (umlaut again) < PIE *sod-eye-. PIE *se-sod-e "sat" (perfect) > Sanskrit sa-sād-a per Brugmann's law.
*sd-: in compounds, as *ni- "down" + *sd- = *nisdos "nest": English nest < Proto-Germanic *nistaz, Latin nīdus < *nizdos (all regular developments); Slavic gnězdo < *g-ně-sd-os. The 3pl (third person plural) of the perfect would have been *se-sd-ṛ whence Indo-Iranian *sazdṛ, which gives (by regular developments) Sanskrit sedur /seːdur/.

Roots *dō and *stā

In addition to the commonplace roots of consonant + vowel + consonant structure, there are also well-attested roots like *dhē- "put, place" and *dō- "give" (mentioned above): these end in a vowel, which is always long in the categories where roots like *sed- have full grades; and in those forms where zero grade would be expected, if before an affix beginning with a consonant, we find a short vowel, reconstructed as *ə, or schwa (more formally, schwa primum indogermanicum). An independent schwa, like the one in PIE *pǝter- "father," can be identified by the distinctive cross-language correspondences of this vowel that are different from the other five short vowels. (Before an affix beginning with a vowel, there is no trace of a vowel in the root, as shown below.)

Since short vowels disappear entirely in roots like *sed-/*sod-/*sd-, it was a reasonable inference that a long vowel under the same conditions would not quite disappear, but would leave a sort of residue. This residue is reflected as i in Indic while dropping in Iranian; it gives variously e, a, o in Greek; it mostly falls together with the reflexes of PIE *a in the other languages (always bearing in mind that short vowels in non-initial syllables undergo various developments in Italic, Celtic, and Germanic):

*dō- "give": in Latin dōnum "gift" = Old Irish dán /daːn/ and Sanskrit dâna- (â = ā with tonic accent); Greek dí-dō-mi (reduplicated present) "I give" = Sanskrit dádāmi; Slavic damъ 'I give'. But in the participles, Greek dotós "given" = Sanskrit ditá-, Latin datus all < *də-tó-.
*stā- "stand": in Greek hístēmi (reduplicated present, regular from *si-stā-), Sanskrit a-sthā-t aorist "stood", Latin testāmentum "testimony" < *ter-stā- < *tri-stā- "third party", Slavic sta-ti 'to stand'. But Sanskrit sthitá-"stood", Greek stásis "a standing", Latin supine infinitive statum "to stand".

Conventional wisdom lined up roots of the *sed- and *dō- types as follows:

But there are other patterns of normal roots, such as those ending with one of the six resonants (*y w r l m n), a class of sounds whose peculiarity in Proto-Indo-European is that they are both syllabic (vowels, in effect) and consonants, depending on what sounds are adjacent:

Root *bher-/bhor-/bhṛ- ~ bhr
*bher-: in Latin ferō = Greek phérō, Avestan barā, Sanskrit bharāmi, Old Irish biur, Old Norse ber, Old English bere all "I carry"; Slavic berǫ 'I take'; Latin ferculum "bier, litter" < *bher-tlo- "implement for carrying".
*bhor-: in Gothic and Scandinavian barn "child" (= English dial. bairn), Greek phoréō "I wear [clothes]" (frequentative formation, *"carry around"); Sanskrit bhâra- "burden" (*bhor-o- via Brugmann's law); Slavic vyborъ 'choice'.
- before consonants: Sanskrit - "a carrying"; Gothic gabaurþs /gaˈbɔrθs/, Old English ġebyrd /jəˈbyɹd/, Old High German geburt all "birth" < *gaburdi- < *; Slavic bьrati 'to take'.
*bhr- before vowels: Ved bibhrati 3pl. "they carry" < *; Greek di-phrós "chariot footboard big enough for two men" < *dwi-bhr-o-.

Saussure's insight was to align the long-vowel roots like *dō-, *stā- with roots like *bher-, rather than with roots of the *sed- sort. That is, treating schwa not as a residue of a long vowel, but like the *r of *bher-/*bhor-/*bhṛ-, an element that was present in the root in all grades, but which in full grade forms coalesced with an ordinary e/o root vowel to make a long vowel, with colouring of the e grade into the bargain; the mystery element was seen by itself only in zero grade forms:

( = syllabic form of the mystery element)

Saussure treated only two of these elements, corresponding to our *h₂ and *h₃. Later it was noticed that the explanatory power of the theory, as well as its elegance, were enhanced if a third element were added, our *h₁, which has the same lengthening and syllabifying properties as the other two but has no effect on the colour of adjacent vowels. Saussure did not suggest as to the phonetics of these elements; his term for them, coefficients sonantiques, did not fail, but merely the term in general use for glides, nasals, and liquids (i.e., the PIE resonants) as in roots like *bher-.

As mentioned above, in forms like *dwi-bhr-o- (etymon of Greek diphrós, above), the new coefficients sonantiques (unlike the six resonants) have no reflexes at all in any daughter language. Thus the compound *- "to 'fix thought', be devout, become rapt" forms a noun *- seen in Proto-Indo-Iranian *mazdha- whence Sanskrit medhá- /mēdha/ "sacrificial rite, holiness" (regular development as in sedur < *sazdur, above), Avestan mazda- "name (originally an epithet) of the greatest deity".

Root *bhendh
There is another kind of unproblematic root, in which obstruents flank a resonant. In the zero grade, unlike the case with roots of the *bher- type, the resonant is therefore always syllabic (being always between two consonants). An example would be *bhendh- "tie, bind":

*bhendh-: in Germanic forms like Old English bindan "to tie, bind", Gothic bindan; Lithuanian beñdras "chum", Greek peĩsma "rope, cable" /pêːsma/ < *phenth-sma < *bhendh-smṇ.
*bhondh-: in Sanskrit bandhá- "bond, fastening" (*bhondh-o-; Grassmann's law) = Old Icelandic bant, OE bænd; Old English bænd, Gothic band "he tied" < *(bhe)bhondh-e.
-: in Sanskrit baddhá- < *- (Bartholomae's law), Old English gebunden, Gothic bundan; German Bund "league." (English bind and bound show the effects of secondary (Middle English) vowel lengthening; the original length is preserved in bundle.)

This is all straightforward and such roots fit directly into the overall patterns. Less so are certain roots that seem sometimes to go like the *bher- type, and sometimes to be unlike any other, with (for example) long syllabics in the zero grades while at times pointing to a two-vowel root structure. These roots are variously called heavy bases, disyllabic roots, and seṭ roots (the last being a term from Pāṇini's grammar. It will be explained below).

Root *ǵen, *ǵon, *ǵṇn-/*ǵṇ̄
For example, the root "be born, arise" is given in the usual etymological dictionaries as follows:

(A) -
(B) -

The (A) forms occur when the root is followed by an affix beginning with a vowel; the (B) forms when the affix begins with a consonant. As mentioned, the full-grade (A) forms look just like the *bher- type, but the zero grades always and only have reflexes of syllabic resonants, just like the *bhendh- type; and unlike any other type, there is a second root vowel (always and only *ə) following the second consonant:

*ǵen(ə)-
(A) PIE *ǵenos- neut s-stem "race, clan" > Greek (Homeric) génos, -eos, Sanskrit jánas-, Avestan zanō, Latin genus, -eris.
(B) Greek gené-tēs "begetter, father"; géne-sis < *ǵenə-ti- "origin"; Sanskrit jáni-man- "birth, lineage", jáni-tar- "progenitor, father", Latin genitus "begotten" < genatos.

*ǵon(e)-
(A) Sanskrit janayati "beget" = Old English cennan /kennan/ < *ǵon-eye- (causative); Sanskrit jána- "race" (o-grade o-stem) = Greek gónos, -ou "offspring".
(B) Sanskrit jajāna 3sg. "was born" < *ǵe-ǵon-e.

*ǵṇn-/*ǵṇ̄-
(A) Gothic kuni "clan, family" = OE cynn /künn/, English kin; Rigvedic jajanúr 3pl.perfect < *- (a relic; the regular Sanskrit form in paradigms like this is jajñur, a remodelling).
(B) Sanskrit jātá- "born" = Latin nātus (Old Latin gnātus, and cf. forms like cognātus "related by birth", Greek kasí-gnētos "brother"); Greek gnḗsios "belonging to the race". (The ē in these Greek forms can be shown to be original, not Attic-Ionic developments from Proto-Greek *ā.)

On the term seṭ. The Pāṇinian term seṭ (that is, sa-i-ṭ) is literally with an /i/. This refers to the fact that roots so designated, like jan- "be born", have an /i/ between the root and the suffix, as we have seen in Sanskrit jánitar-, jániman-, janitva (a gerund). Cf. such formations built to aniṭ (without an /i/) roots, such as han- "slay": hántar- "slayer", hanman- "a slaying", hantva (gerund). In Pāṇini's analysis, this /i/ is a linking vowel, not properly a part of either the root or the suffix. It is simply that some roots are in effect in the list consisting of the roots that take an -i-.

But historians have the advantage here: the peculiarities of alternation, the presence of /i/, and the fact that the only vowel allowed in second place in a root happens to be *ə, are all neatly explained once *ǵenə- and the like were understood to be properly *ǵenH-. That is, the patterns of alternation, from of Indo-European, were simply those of *bhendh-, with the additional detail that *H, unlike obstruents (stops and *s) would become a syllable between two consonants, hence the *ǵenə- shape in the Type (B) formations, above.

Discussion
The startling reflexes of these roots in zero-grade before a consonant (in this case, Sanskrit ā, Greek nē, Latin nā, Lithuanian ìn) is explained by the lengthening of the (originally perfectly ordinary) syllabic resonant before the lost laryngeal, while the same laryngeal protects the syllabic status of the preceding resonant even before an affix beginning with a vowel: the archaic Vedic form jajanur cited above is structurally quite the same (*) as a form like * "they saw" < *.

Incidentally, redesigning the root as *ǵenH- has another consequence. Several of the Sanskrit forms cited above come from what look like o-grade root vowels in open syllables, but fail to lengthen to -ā- per Brugmann's law. All becomes clear when it is understood that in such forms as *ǵonH- before a vowel, the *o is not in fact in an open syllable. And in turn, that means that a form like jajāna "was born," which apparently does show the action of Brugmann's law, is a false witness: in the Sanskrit perfect tense, the whole class of seṭ roots, en masse, acquired the shape of the aniṭ 3sing. forms. (See Brugmann's law for further discussion.)

Other roots
There are also roots ending in a stop followed by a laryngeal, as *- "spread, flatten," from which Sanskrit - "broad" masc. (= Avestan pərəθu-), pṛthivī- fem., Greek platús (zero grade); Skt. prathimán- "wideness" (full grade), Greek platamṓn "flat stone." The laryngeal explains (a) the change of *t to *th in Proto-Indo-Iranian, (b) the correspondence between Greek -a-, Sanskrit -i- and no vowel in Avestan (Avestan pərəθwī "broad" fem. in two syllables vs Sanskrit pṛthivī- in three).

Caution has to be used in interpreting data from Indic in particular. Sanskrit remained in use as a poetic, scientific, and classical language for many centuries, and the multitude of inherited patterns of alternation of obscure motivation (such as the division into seṭ and aniṭ roots) provided models for coining new forms on the wrong patterns. There are many forms like tṛṣita- "thirsty" and tániman- "slenderness", that is, seṭ formations to unequivocally aniṭ roots; and conversely aniṭ forms like píparti "fills", pṛta- "filled", to securely seṭ roots (cf. the "real" past participle, pūrṇá-). Sanskrit preserves the effects of laryngeal phonology with wonderful clarity but looks upon the historical linguist with a threatening eye: for even in Vedic Sanskrit, the evidence has to be weighed carefully with due concern for the antiquity of the forms and the overall texture of the data. (It is no help that Proto-Indo-European itself had roots which varied in their makeup, as *ǵhew- and *ǵhewd-, both "pour"; and some of these root extensions are, unluckily, laryngeals.)

Stray laryngeals can be found in isolated or seemingly isolated forms; here the three-way Greek reflexes of syllabic *h₁, *h₂, *h₃ are particularly helpful, as seen below. (Comments on the forms follow.)

 in Greek ánemos "wind" (cf. Latin animus "breath, spirit; mind," Vedic aniti "breathes") < *anə- "breathe; blow" (now *h₂enh₁-). Perhaps also Greek híeros "mighty, super-human; divine; holy," cf. Sanskrit iṣirá- "vigorous, energetic."
 in Greek patḗr "father" = Sanskrit pitár-, Old English fæder, Gothic fadar, Latin pater. Also * "big" neut. > Greek méga, Sanskrit máha.
 in Greek árotron "plow" = Welsh aradr, Old Norse arðr, Lithuanian árklas.

Comments

The Greek forms ánemos and árotron are particularly valuable because the verb roots in question are extinct in Greek as verbs. This means that there is no possibility of some sort of analogical interference, for example, happened in the case of Latin arātrum "plow", whose shape has been distorted by the verb arāre "to plow" (the exact cognate to the Greek form would have been *aretrum). It used to be standard to explain the root vowels of Greek thetós, statós, dotós "put, stood, given" as analogical. Most scholars nowadays probably take them as original, but in the case of "wind" and "plow", the argument can't even come up.

Regarding Greek híeros, the pseudo-participle affix *-ro- is added directly to the verb root, so *- > *isero- > *ihero- > híeros (with regular throwback of the aspiration to the beginning of the word), and Sanskrit iṣirá-. There seems to be no question of the existence of a root *eysH- "vigorously move/cause to move". If the word began with a laryngeal, and most scholars would agree that it did, it would have to be *h₁-, specifically; and that's a problem. A root of the shape *h₁eysh₁- is not possible. Indo-European had no roots of the type *mem-, *tet-, *dhredh-, i.e., with two copies of the same consonant. But Greek attests an earlier (and rather more widely attested) form of the same meaning, híaros. If we reconstruct *h₁eysh₂-, all of our problems are solved in one stroke. The explanation for the híeros/híaros business has long been discussed, without much result; laryngeal theory now provides the opportunity for an explanation which did not exist before, namely the metathesis of the two laryngeals. It is still only a guess, but it is a much simpler and more elegant guess than the guesses available before.

The syllabic * in *- "father" might not be isolated. Certain evidence shows that the kinship affix seen in "mother, father" etc. might have been *-h₂ter- instead of *-ter-. The laryngeal syllabified after a consonant (thus Greek patḗr, Latin pater, Sanskrit pitár-; Greek thugátēr, Sanskrit duhitár- "daughter") but lengthened a preceding vowel (thus say Latin māter "mother", frāter "brother") — even when the "vowel" in question was a syllabic resonant, as in Sanskrit yātaras "husbands' wives" < *- < *-).

Laryngeals in morphology

Like any other consonant, Laryngeals feature in the endings of verbs and nouns and derivational morphology, the only difference being the greater difficulty of telling what's going on. Indo-Iranian, for example, can retain forms that pretty clearly reflect a laryngeal, but there is no way of knowing which one.

The following is a rundown of laryngeals in Proto-Indo-European morphology.

*h₁ is seen in the instrumental ending (probably originally indifferent to number, like English expressions of the type by hand and on foot). In Sanskrit, feminine i- and u-stems have instrumentals in -ī, -ū, respectively. In the Rigveda, there are a few old a-stems (PIE o-stems) with an instrumental in -ā; but even in that oldest text the usual ending is -enā, from the n-stems.
Greek has some adverbs in -ē, but more important are the Mycenaean forms like e-re-pa-te "with ivory" (i.e. elephantē? -ě?)

The marker of the neuter dual was *-iH, as in Sanskrit bharatī "two carrying ones (neut.)", nāmanī "two names", yuge "two yokes" (< yuga-i? *yuga-ī?). Greek to the rescue: the Homeric form ósse "the (two) eyes" is manifestly from *h₃ekʷ-ih₁ (formerly *okʷ-ī) via fully regular sound laws (intermediately *okʷye).

*-eh₁- derives stative verb senses from eventive roots: PIE *sed- "sit (down)": *sed-eh₁- "be in a sitting position" (> Proto-Italic *sed-ē-ye-mos "we are sitting" > Latin sedēmus). It is attested in Celtic, Italic, Germanic (the Class IV weak verbs), and Baltic/Slavic, with some traces in Indo-Iranian (In Avestan the affix seems to form past-habitual stems).

It seems likely, though it is less certain, that this same *-h₁ underlies the nominative-accusative dual in o-stems: Sanskrit vṛkā, Greek lúkō "two wolves". (The alternative ending -āu in Sanskrit cuts a small figure in the Rigveda, but eventually becomes the standard form of the o-stem dual.)

*-h₁s- derives desiderative stems as in Sanskrit jighāṃsati "desires to slay" < *gʷhi-gʷhṇ-h₁s-e-ti- (root *gʷhen-, Sanskrit han- "slay"). This is the source of Greek future tense formations and (with the addition of a thematic suffix *-ye/o-) the Indo-Iranian one as well: bhariṣyati "will carry" < *bher-h₁s-ye-ti.

*-yeh₁-/*-ih₁- is the optative suffix for root verb inflections, e.g. Latin (old) siet "may he be", sīmus "may we be", Sanskrit syāt "may he be", and so on.

*h₂ is seen as the marker of the neuter plural: *-h₂ in the consonant stems, *-eh₂ in the vowel stems. Much levelling and remodelling are seen in the daughter languages that preserve any ending at all, thus Latin has generalized *-ā throughout the noun system (later regularly shortened to -a), Greek generalized -ǎ < *-h₂.

The categories masculine/feminine plainly did not exist in the most original form of Proto-Indo-European, and there are very few noun types which are formally different in the two genders. The formal differences are mostly to be seen in adjectives (and not all of them) and pronouns. Both types of derived feminine stems feature *h₂: a type that is patently derived from the o-stem nominals; and an ablauting type showing alternations between *-yeh₂- and *-ih₂-. Both are peculiar in having no actual marker for the nominative singular, and at least as far as the *-eh₂- type, two features seem clear: it is based on the o-stems, and the nom.sg. is probably in origin a neuter plural. (An archaic trait of Indo-European morpho-syntax is that plural neuter nouns construe with singular verbs, and quite possibly *yugeh₂ was not so much "yokes" in our sense, but "yokage; a harnessing-up".) Once that much is thought of, however, it is not easy to pin down the details of the "ā-stems" in the Indo-European languages outside of Anatolia, and such an analysis sheds no light at all on the *-yeh₂-/*-ih₂- stems, which (like the *eh₂-stems) form feminine adjective stems and derived nouns (e.g. Sanskrit devī- "goddess" from deva- "god") but unlike the "ā-stems" have no foundation in any neuter category.

*-eh₂- seems to have formed factitive verbs, as in *new-eh₂- "to renew, make new again", as seen in Latin novāre, Greek neáō and Hittite ne-wa-aḫ-ḫa-an-t- (participle) all "renew" but all three with the pregnant sense of "plow anew; return fallow land to cultivation".

*-h₂- marked the 1st person singular, with a confusing distribution: in the thematic active (the familiar -ō ending of Greek and Latin, and Indo-Iranian -ā(mi)), and also in the perfect tense (not really a tense in PIE): *-h₂e as in Greek oîda "I know" < *woyd-h₂e. It is the basis of the Hittite ending -ḫḫi, as in da-aḫ-ḫi "I take" < *-ḫa-i (original *-ḫa embellished with the primary tense marker with subsequent smoothing of the diphthong).

*-eh₃ may be tentatively identified in a directive case. No such case is found in Indo-European noun paradigms, but such a construct accounts for a curious collection of Hittite forms like ne-pi-ša "(in)to the sky", ták-na-a "to, into the ground", a-ru-na "to the sea". These are sometimes explained as o-stem datives in -a < *-ōy, an ending attested in Greek and Indo-Iranian, among others, but there are serious problems with such a view, and the forms are highly coherent, functionally. And there are also appropriate adverbs in Greek and Latin (elements lost in productive paradigms sometimes survive in stray forms, like the old instrumental case of the definite article in English expressions like the more the merrier): Greek ánō "upwards, kátō "downwards", Latin quō "whither?", eō "to that place"; and perhaps even the Indic preposition/preverb â "to(ward)" which has no satisfactory competing etymology. (These forms must be distinguished from the similar-looking ones formed to the ablative in *-ōd and with a distinctive "fromness" sense: Greek ópō "whence, from where".)

Criticism

Throughout its history, the laryngeal theory in its various forms has been subject to extensive criticism and revision.

The original argument of Saussure was not accepted by anyone in the Neogrammarian school, primarily based at the University of Leipzig, then reigning at the cutting-edge of Indo-European linguistics. Several of them attacked the Mémoire savagely. Osthoff's criticism was particularly virulent, often descending into personal invective.

For the first half-century of its existence, the laryngeal theory was widely seen as ‘an eccentric fancy of outsiders’. In Germany it was roundly rejected. Among its early proponents were Hermann Möller, who extended Saussure's system with a third, non-colouring laryngeal, Albert Cuny, Holger Pedersen, and Karl Oštir. The fact that these scholars were engaged in highly speculative long-range linguistic comparison further contributed to its isolation.

Although the founding fathers were able to provide some indirect evidence of a lost consonantal element (for example, the origin of the Indo-Iranian voiceless aspirates in *CH sequences and the ablaut pattern of the heavy bases, *CeRə- ~ *CR̥̄- in the traditional formulation), the direct evidence so crucial for the Neogrammarian thinking was lacking. Saussure's structural considerations were foreign to the leading contemporary linguists.

After Kuryłowicz's convincing demonstration that the Hittite language preserved at least some of Saussure's coefficients sonantiques, the focus of the debate shifted. It was still unclear how many laryngeals are to be posited to account for the new facts and what effect they have had exactly. Kuryłowicz, after a while, settled on four laryngeals, an approach further accepted by Sapir, Sturtevant, and through them much of American linguistics. The three-laryngeal system was defended, among others, by Walter Couvreur and Émile Benveniste. Many individual proposals were made, which assumed up to ten laryngeals (André Martinet). While some scholars, like Heinz Kronasser and Giuliano Bonfante, attempted to disregard Anatolian evidence altogether, the ‘minimal’ serious proposal (with roots in Pedersen's early ideas) was put forward by Hans Hendriksen, Louis Hammerich and later Ladislav Zgusta, who assumed a single /H/ phoneme without vowel-colouring effects.

By the 2000s, however, a widespread, though not unanimous, agreement was reached in the field on reconstructing Möller's three laryngeals. One of the last major critics of this approach was Oswald Szemerényi, who subscribed to a theory similar to Zgusta's .

Today the laryngeal theory is almost universally accepted in this new standard form. Nevertheless, marginal attempts to undermine its bases are occasionally undertaken.

References

Bibliography

External links
 
Kortlandt, Frederik (2001): Initial laryngeals in Anatolian (pdf)
Lexicon of Early Indo-European Loanwords Preserved in Finnish

Indo-European linguistics
Proto-Indo-European language
Ferdinand de Saussure